Democratic Union–Broad Centre (UDCA) was a Catalan political party founded in November 1978 by Antón Cañellas, together with other former Democratic Union of Catalonia (UDC) members—such as Francesc Blanch i Terrades, Santiago Guillén or Josep-Rafel Carreras de Nadal—after being expelled from the UDC because of his support to the electoral platform established by the Union of the Democratic Centre (UCD) and the Union of the Centre of Catalonia (UCC). The party would be officially registered in the interior ministry on 19 December 1978, with Cañellas as its secretary-general.

In December 1979 it would be merged into the Centrists of Catalonia alliance, with Cañellas becoming the president of the newly unified party. At the time of its dissolution, the party had 300 members.

Electoral performance

Cortes Generales

References

1978 establishments in Catalonia
1979 disestablishments in Catalonia
Defunct political parties in Catalonia
Political parties established in 1978
Political parties disestablished in 1979